Kirchmann is a surname. Notable people with the surname include:

Bohuslav Kirchmann (born 1902 - date of death unknown), Czech fencer
Leah Kirchmann (born 1990), Canadian racing cyclist
Sigrid Kirchmann (born 1966), former high jumper from Austria

See also
Julius von Kirchmann (1802–1884), German jurist and philosopher
Kirkman (harpsichord makers), also called Kirchmann